The Wingecarribee River (Aboriginal Dharawal: Winge Karrabee), a perennial river that is part of the Hawkesbury–Nepean catchment, is located in the Southern Highlands region of New South Wales, Australia.

Course and features
Wingecarribee River rises on the heights at Robertson below Wingecarribee Reservoir, near the village of Glenquarry, and flows generally northwest, joined by two minor tributaries and through the Belanglo State Forest and Bangadilly National Park, before reaching its confluence with the Wollondilly River north of the locality of Tugalong, northwest of Berrima. The river descends  over its  course.

In its upper reaches, the feeder creeks of the Wingecarribee form the Wingecarribee Swamp, the only substantial peat bog in New South Wales. Most of the swamp has been drained and the remaining section of the swamp is the habitat of a number of endangered species. The river runs through a valley on the plateau that is home to a popular camp, Biloela.

The Moss Vale Road crosses the river at Bong Bong, between Bowral and Moss Vale. At Berrima, the river is crossed by the Hume Freeway.

The Shoalhaven Scheme pumps water from the Shoalhaven River into the Wingecarribee Reservoir and this water supply augments the water supply for greater metropolitan Sydney.

See also 

 List of rivers of New South Wales (L–Z)
 List of rivers of Australia
 Rivers of New South Wales

References

External links
 

Rivers of New South Wales
Southern Highlands (New South Wales)
Hume Highway